The North Eastern League was a regional Scottish football competition held during the Second World War, due to the suspension of the Scottish Football League. Held between 1941 and 1945 (an interim nationwide War Emergency League was played in the 1939–40 season followed by one year of hiatus), the competition was played in two stages each season (autumn and spring), with bonus points awarded in the second stage: initially, for teams with higher aggregate scores over the two series; latterly, for away draws/wins. Some reserve teams from the bigger clubs competing in the other region, the Southern League, entered the North Eastern League, with the Rangers 'A' team winning both stages in the first season.

In the 1945–46 season, with the war itself at an end, the North Eastern League merged with the Southern League; however, only Aberdeen participated in the A Division (finishing in third position); the rest of the clubs were placed in the B Division along with some from the Southern region including those who had finished at the foot of the table in its previous edition.

There was also a North Eastern League Cup. Regular football returned in 1946, with the regional competitions disbanded.

Tables

1941–42

First Series

Second Series

	
BP – an extra point was awarded by having a better aggregate score over each opponent

1942–43

First Series

Second Series

	
BP – an extra point was awarded by having a better aggregate score over each opponent

1943–44

First Series

Second Series

	
BP – 3 points were awarded for an away win, 2 points for an away draw

1944–45

First Series

Second Series

BP – 3 points were awarded for an away win, 2 points for an away draw

See also
Association football during World War II

Defunct football leagues in Scotland
Wartime football in Scotland
Recurring sporting events disestablished in 1945
Recurring sporting events established in 1941
1945 disestablishments in Scotland
1941 establishments in Scotland